The PEN/John Kenneth Galbraith Award for nonfiction is awarded by PEN America (formerly PEN American Center) biennially "to a distinguished book of general nonfiction possessing notable literary merit and critical perspective and illuminating important contemporary issues which have been published in the United States during the previous two calendar years. It is intended that the winning book possess the qualities of intellectual rigor, perspicuity of expression, and stylistic elegance conspicuous in the writings of author and economist John Kenneth Galbraith, whose four dozen books and countless other publications continue to provide an important and incisive commentary on the American social, intellectual and political scene."

The winner receives $10,000.

The award is one of many PEN awards sponsored by International PEN affiliates in over 145 PEN centres around the world. The PEN American Center awards have been characterized as being among the "major" American literary prizes.

Award winners

References

External links
PEN America
PEN/John Kenneth Galbraith Award for Nonfiction

PEN America awards
Awards established in 2007
2007 establishments in the United States
American non-fiction literary awards